The Dezhou–Dajiawa railway is a single-track electrified railway line in China. Passenger services currently operate between Dezhou and Dongying South, the section from Dongying South to Dajiawa is only used by freight trains.

History
Construction on the line began in November 2009. The line was built as a joint project between the Ministry of Railways and Shandong Province.

The railway opened with the first passenger services on 28 September 2015. Freight operation began in 2017.

Route
The line departs from the Beijing–Shanghai railway south of Dezhou and heads east. There are several branches, including a chord which leads on to the Zibo–Dongying railway heading north towards Dongying. It crosses the Yellow River east of Binzhou. At Dajiawa, the line continues east as the freight-only Dajiawa–Laizhou–Longkou railway.

The line is used for coal transportation to a plant near Binzhou.

References

Railway lines in China
Railway lines opened in 2015